Leo Appelt (born 26 May 1997 in Hanover) is a German former road cyclist.  In 2015 Appelt won the junior world time trial championship.

Major results

2014
 4th Overall Sint–Martinusprijs Kontich
1st Prologue
2015
 1st  Time trial, UCI Junior Road World Championships
 1st  Individual pursuit, UCI Junior Track World Championships
 1st  Overall Internationale Niedersachsen–Rundfahrt Junioren
1st Stage 1
 5th Grand Prix Rüebliland

References

1997 births
Living people
German male cyclists
Sportspeople from Hanover
Cyclists from Lower Saxony